David Griffiths (22 March 1896 – 13 January 1977) was a British Labour Party politician.

At the 1945 general election, he was elected as member of parliament for Rother Valley. He held the seat through six further general elections until his retirement from the House of Commons at the 1970 election.

References

Griffths, David
Griffths, David
Griffths, David
National Union of Mineworkers-sponsored MPs
UK MPs 1945–1950
UK MPs 1950–1951
UK MPs 1951–1955
UK MPs 1955–1959
UK MPs 1959–1964
UK MPs 1964–1966
UK MPs 1966–1970